Besla ranae is a species of sea snail, a marine gastropod mollusk in the family Pyramidellidae, the pyrams and their allies. The species is one of twelve known species within the Besla genus of gastropods.

References

 Dall W. H. & Bartsch P. (1904). Synopsis of the genera, subgenera and sections of the family Pyramidellidae. Proceedings of the Biological Society of Washington 17: 1-16

External links
 

Pyramidellidae
Gastropods described in 1961